Mikhaylovsky is a closed rural locality (a settlement) in Saratov Oblast, Russia. Population:

History
It was founded in 2002.

Administrative and municipal status
Within the framework of administrative divisions, it is incorporated as the closed administrative-territorial formation of Mikhaylovsky—an administrative unit with the status equal to that of the districts. As a municipal division, the closed administrative-territorial formation of Mikhaylovsky is incorporated as Mikhaylovsky Urban Okrug.

References

Notes

Sources

Rural localities in Saratov Oblast
Closed cities
Populated places established in 2002
2002 establishments in Russia